Run for Cover Records is an American independent record label based in Boston, Massachusetts. Founded in 2004 by Jeff Casazza at the age of 17 with a $1,000 loan, the label functioned as a small one-person bedroom operation in Brighton, until Casazza graduated Suffolk University in 2010.

Known for working with undiscovered young bands from all over the world, RFC can be credited for helping launch the careers of Tigers Jaw, Modern Baseball, Title Fight, Citizen, Turnover, Pinegrove, Basement, and many more, as well as working with already notable acts like Alex G, Camp Cope, mewithoutYou, Teen Suicide, and Nothing.

History

2004–2010
RFC was largely operated out of multiple apartments while Casazza attended Suffolk University. Releasing only 7-inch EPs and singles up until 2009, in 2010, the label released eight LPs, mostly from bourgeoning northeastern rock bands like Balance and Composure, Tigers Jaw, The Wonder Years, and Hostage Calm. The label started gaining traction quickly due to the rising DIY music scenes along the East Coast, most notably northeastern Pennsylvania, where Title Fight, Balance and Composure, Tigers Jaw, and other bands are from.

2011–2013
In 2011, the label moved into a downtown Back Bay apartment rented by Kevin Duquette, owner of Topshelf Records. At this time, the label officially hired its first employees, label manager Tom Chiari and high school friend Taylor Sullivan to handle mail-order. Later in the year, the label released Basement's debut LP I Wish I Could Stay Here, eventually hiring guitarist Alex Henery in 2012. Also in 2011, RFC released the Mixed Signals compilation consisting of exclusive material from RFC artists, as well as friends and affiliated acts, including songs from Balance and Composure, The World Is a Beautiful Place & I Am No Longer Afraid to Die, The Menzingers, and Tigers Jaw. The album was sold in hundreds of stores across the country for $4.99.

In 2012, RFC signed Citizen and Turnover, the first bands to officially sign 3 album deals with the label. The first release with the label for both bands was a split 7-inch EP that quickly became the label's fastest-selling release at the time.

The label started a subscription vinyl singles series in 2013, consisting of split 7-inches featuring Code Orange, Pity Sex, Adventures, Hostage Calm, The World Is a Beautiful Place, Tigers Jaw, and more.

2014–present
In 2014, RFC parted ways with distributors Revelation Records and Cobraside Distribution, signing a worldwide deal with Alternative Distribution Alliance, Warner Music Group's independent distribution arm.

Later that year, RFC won "Record Label of the Year" from renowned Boston publication The Improper Bostonian.

2015 saw the release of Turnover's sophomore LP Peripheral Vision, which would go on to SoundScan over 100,000 copies.

RFC launched Something In The Way Festival on December 14, 2016, selling out all three rooms of Webster Hall in New York City, and the Royale in Boston. The festival featured artists and friends curated by the label, including Modern Baseball, Basement, Citizen, Turnover, mewithoutYou, Pinegrove, Nothing, Alex G, Elvis Depressedly, Teen Suicide, Nicole Dollanganger, Crying, Horse Jumper of Love, and Petal.

Their YouTube channel, which features songs and videos from artists on their roster, has 145,000 subscribers and over 117 million views (as of May 25, 2022).

In 2019, RFC joined Captured Tracks, Sacred Bones, Dead Oceans, Ghostly International and Jagjaguwar at Secretly Distribution.

Current artists

 Advance Base 
 Another Michael
 Anxious
 The Berries
 Camp Cope
 Citizen
 Crying 
 Fiddlehead
 Field Medic
 Fury
 Glass Beach
 Healing Potpourri
 Horse Jumper of Love
 Katie Dey
 Makthaverskan
 mewithoutYou
 Mini Trees
 Narrow Head
 One Step Closer
 Petal
 Portrayal of Guilt
 Sadurn
 Self Defense Family
 Spencer Radcliffe
 Sun June
 The Berries
 Teen Suicide
 Turnover
 Varsity
 Waveform*
 Westkust
 Wicca Phase Springs Eternal
 Young Guv

Past & affiliated artists

 Adventures
 Agent
 Alex G
 Anne 
 Basement
 Bridge and Tunnel
 Camera Shy
 Captain, We're Sinking
 Cloakroom
 Coasta
 Creative Adult
 CSTVT
 Death Is Not Glamorous
 Elvis Depressedly
 Fireworks
 GDP
 Hostage Calm
 Little Big League
 LVL UP
 Man Overboard
 Memorial
 Mockingbird Wish Me Luck
 Modern Baseball
 Nicole Dollanganger
 Nothing
 Pinegrove
 Pity Sex
 Seahaven
 Shook Ones
 Sinking Ships
 The Sun Days
 Superheaven
 These Days
 This Is Hell
 This Time Next Year
 Tigers Jaw
 Title Fight
 The Tower and the Fool
 Transit
 Vinnie Caruana
 Whirr
 Young Statues

References

Record labels established in 2004
2004 establishments in Massachusetts
Companies based in Boston
American independent record labels
Indie rock record labels
Punk record labels
Alternative rock record labels
Post-hardcore record labels
Record labels based in Massachusetts